This is an incomplete list of notable mountains on Earth, sorted by elevation in metres above sea level.
For a complete list of mountains over 7200 m high, with at least 500 m of prominence, see List of highest mountains. See also a list of mountains ranked by prominence.

8,000 metres
All are in the two highest mountain ranges in the world, the Himalayas and the Karakoram.

7,000 metres 
There are 132 mountains between 7,000 and 8,000 metres (22,966 ft and 26,247 ft)

6,000 metres
There are 117 mountains between 6,000 and 7,000 metres (19,685 ft and 21,966 ft)

5,000 metres
There are 76 mountains between 5,000 and 6,000 metres (16,404 ft and 19,685 ft)

4,000 metres
There are 260 mountains between 4,000 and 5,000 metres (13,123 ft and 16,404 ft)

3,000 metres

2,000 metres

1,000 metres

Under 1,000 metres

See also

 Lists of highest points
 Lists of mountains
 List of volcanoes by elevation

References

Climbing and mountaineering-related lists
 01
 01
Mountains, Elevation